Kal Davud (also Romanized as Kal Dāvūd; also known as Gol-e Dāvūd) is a village in Qaleh Shahin Rural District, in the Central District of Sarpol-e Zahab County, Kermanshah Province, Iran. At the 2006 census, its population was 131, in 28 families.

References 

Populated places in Sarpol-e Zahab County